Blite could refer to any one of the following plants:

 Amaranthus blitum
 Strawberry blite (Chenopodium capitatum, formerly of the genus Blitum)
 Chenopodium bonus-henricus
 Some species of Atriplex
 Coastblite goosefoot
 Sea blite (aka plant genus Suaeda)

Not to be confused with blight, a plant disease.